Janie is a 1944 film directed by Michael Curtiz, based on a 1942 Broadway play by Josephine Bentham and Herschel V. Williams Jr. The play was adapted from Benthams's 1940 novel by the same name.

Plot
Janie is a free-spirited, teenage girl living in a small town. World War II brings the establishment of an army camp nearby, which is opposed by her father, the local newspaper publisher. Janie and her bobby soxer friends have their hearts set afire by the prospect of so many young soldiers so close. She enjoys dating an Army man, which makes her local boyfriend jealous.

Cast
 Joyce Reynolds as Janie Conway
 Robert Hutton as Pfc. Dick Lawrence
 Edward Arnold as Charles Conway
 Ann Harding as Lucille Conway
 Alan Hale as Professor Reardon
 Robert Benchley as John Van Brunt
 Clare Foley as Elsbeth Conway
 Barbara Brown as Thelma Lawrence
 Hattie McDaniel as April
 Richard Erdman as Scooper Nolan
 Jackie Moran as Mickey the Sailor
 Ann Gillis as Paula Rainey
 Russell Hicks as Colonel Lucas
 Ruth Tobey as Bernadine Dodd
 Virginia Patton as Carrie Lou
 Colleen Townsend as Hortense Bennett
 William Frambes as Private Hackett

Unbilled players include Keefe Brasselle, Jimmie Dodd, Sunset Carson, Julie London, Virginia Sale, and The Williams Brothers with Andy Williams.

Reception
Bosley Crowther, critic for The New York Times, panned the film, writing "The authors of Janie, play and picture, have simply cut a theatrical farce with some kids. And the bluntness with which they have done so provides very little warm appeal...The performance of Joyce Reynolds in the title role is completely surface and pretentious; she had nothing with which to work".

The film was followed two years later by the sequel Janie Gets Married.

See also
 List of American films of 1944

References

External links
 
 
 
 

1944 films
1944 romantic comedy films
American black-and-white films
American romantic comedy films
American films based on plays
Films directed by Michael Curtiz
Films set on the home front during World War II
Warner Bros. films
Films scored by Heinz Roemheld
1940s English-language films
1940s American films